Anno may refer to:

People
Anno of Saint Gall (died 954), Anti-Abbot of St. Gall
Anno II (Archbishop of Cologne) ( 1010–1075), Archbishop of Cologne from 1056 to 1075
Anno (surname)
Anno Birkin (1980–2001), English musician
Hideaki Anno (1960-), Anime director

Arts and media
 Anno (video game series)
Anno Dracula series, fantasy novels by Kim Newman
Anno's Journey, a series of children's books by Mitsumasa Anno

Other
Anno, Ivory Coast, a settlement in Lagunes District
Anno (Austrian Newspapers Online), a digitisation initiative of the Austrian National Library
Anno, a form of the Latin noun annum
Anno Hegirae, in the Islamic calendar, ("in the year of the Hijra"), abbreviated as AH or H
Anno Domini ("in the year of (Our) Lord"), abbreviated as AD, an epoch based on the traditionally-reckoned year of the conception or birth of Jesus of Nazareth
Anno Mundi ("in the year of the world"), abbreviated AM, a Calendar era counting from the creation of the world
Quadragesimo anno, an encyclical by Pope Pius XI, issued 15 May 1931

See also
Ano (disambiguation)
Annon
Paul Di'Anno (born 1958, as Paul Andrews), vocalist in the band Iron Maiden